was France's first privately owned free-to-air television network. Created by politician Jérôme Seydoux and Italian media mogul Silvio Berlusconi, the network broadcast from 1985 to 1992.

The contract for France's fifth terrestrial network, which was supposed to have been in effect for an 18-year term, was granted to Seydoux and Berlusconi in November 1985. Programming began on 20 February 1986 at 8:30 pm; the first program on La Cinq was Voilà la Cinq, which was taped at Canale 5's studios in Milan, Italy.

History

Pre-launch (1985–1986)
In 1985, a little over a year before the legislative elections, the Socialist Party feared failure and then wanted to create a new space, outside the institutional domain of public television, capable of reaching a large audience (contrary to the private subscription channel Canal+) and to constitute a relay of opinion to its ideas if it was to return to the opposition.

On 20 November 1985, the government granted an 18-year concession to France Cinq, allowing them to operate the fifth national television network. This decision was criticized by the Minister of Culture and some of the President's advisers, who wanted to see cultural programming, and by the Haute Autorité de la Communication Audiovisuelle, which did not approve of the conditions but had no power to change them. At a press conference on 22 November 1985, Jérome Seydoux and Silvio Berlusconi presented the focus and style of the programs that would be broadcast on the future fifth television channel. In response to critics who accused them of wanting to create "Coca-Cola" TV, Berlusconi, who developed La Cinq's programming from his catalogues, replied that the channel would be "neither Coca-Cola TV, nor spaghetti TV, but rather Beaujolais TV, a Saturday champagne. He also promised to feature well-liked TV or film stars.

Determined to block this project, 60 senators had the Constitutional Council declare "The Eiffel Tower Amendment" (fr: amendement Tour Eiffel) unconstitutional on 13 December 1985. This forced the government to pass in force by drafting a new bill, which was accepted by Parliament on 21 December. On December 31, 1985, the France 5 company was incorporated in anonymous form with its registered office in Paris. On 16 January 1986 the RTL Group (at the time the Compagnie Luxembourgeoise de Télédiffusion (CLT) unsuccessfully attempted to have the Council of State cancel the concession agreement; instead the government gave the RTL Group the right to use one of the two remaining free channels of the future TDF 1 satellite. On 20 January 1986 Silvio Berlusconi presented the programs of his future commercial channel, officially known as La Cinq, to journalists, industrialists and advertisers in order to convince them to buy advertising airtime to finance the channel. The next day, the police were forced to intervene in order to allow TDF technicians to come install La Cinq's transmitters at the top of the Eiffel Tower, after the City of Paris refused to do so for security reasons.

Launch (1986–early 1987)
After three months of animosity and a month of technical testing, La Cinq was finally able to start broadcasting on Thursday 20 February 1986 at 20:30, airing an introductory broadcast entitled Voila la Cinq, which had been recorded in the Fininvest Group's Milan studio. Up until midnight, Christian Morin, Roger Zabel, Amanda Lear, Ėlisabeth Tordjman and Alain Gillot-Pétré hosted major French stars (Johnny Hallyday, Serge Gainsbourg, Mireille Mathieu, Charles Aznavour) as well as international stars like Ornella Muti, who had been invited by Silvio Berlusconi to support a show that would be able to compete with TF1 or Antenne 2. For the next few weeks, the programming consisted of game shows and variety shows like Pentathlon, C’est beau la vie, and Cherchez la femme,  which had been adapted from successful shows on Silvio Berlusconi's Italian network, Canale 5, and had also been influenced by French magazines like Mode. The programs were repeated every four to five hours and had up to three commercial breaks per show. The first hosts had formerly been presenters on TF1 (Christian Morin), Antenne 2 (Alain Gillot-Pétré, Roger Zabel and Élisabeth Tordjman), or one of Berlusconi's Italian networks (Amanda Lear). A continuity announcer presented the programs.

Starting in February 1986, American TV series aired during daytime and late night programming. Most of these series were familiar to viewers, because they were broadcast on other French networks in the 1960s and 1970s: Diff'rent Strokes, Happy Days, Mission: Impossible, The Twilight Zone, Star Trek, The Dukes of Hazzard and Wonder Woman.

After the launch, the network was invested into feature film production of native theatrical feature films.

Children's programming
La Cinq's children-oriented programming block, Youpi! L'école est finie ("Hooray! School's over!"), began broadcasting on 2 March 1987, and would last until the channel's dissolution. Broadcasting in the morning between 7 and 9 AM and in the evening between 5 and 6 PM, the block was notable for airing French-language dubs of numerous Japanese anime series, including:

 Princess Sarah 
 King Arthur
 Esper Mami (as Malicieuse Kiki)
 Nadia: The Secret of Blue Water (as Nadia, le secret de l'eau bleue)
 Hello! Sandybell (as Sandy Jonquille)
 Pastel Yumi, the Magic Idol (as Susy aux fleurs magiques)
 Hikari no Densetsu (as Cynthia ou le rythme de la vie)
 Lady!! (as Gwendoline)
 Story of the Alps: My Annette (as Dans les Alpes avec Annette)
 Creamy Mami, the Magic Angel (as Creamy, merveilleuse Creamy)
 Captain Tsubasa (as Olive et Tom)
 Persia, the Magic Fairy (as Vanessa et la magie des rêves)
 Attacker You! (as Jeanne et Serge)
 Blue Blink (as Magie Bleue)
 Ganbare, Kickers! (as But por Rudy)
 Ai Shite Knight (as Embrasse-moi Lucile)
 Katri, Girl of the Meadows (as Cathy la petite fermière)
 Tales of Little Women (as Les 4 filles du docteur Match)
 The Swiss Family Robinson: Flone of the Mysterious Island (as Flo et les Robinson suisses)
 Ohayō! Spank (as Les aventures de Claire et Tipoune)
 Kimagure Orange Road (as Max et Compagnie)
 Hiatari Ryōkō! (as Une vie nouvelle)
 Touch (as Théo ou la batte de la victoire)
 Tsurikichi Sanpei (as Paul le pêcheur)
 La Seine no Hoshi (as La tulipe noire)
 Queen Millennia (as La reine du fond des temps)
 Wing-Man Nobody's Boy: Remi Grendizer (as Goldorak)
 Candy Candy Georgie! Grimm's Fairy Tale Classics (as Raconte-moi une histoire)
 Magical Princess Minky Momo (as Gigi)
 Peter Pan: The Animated Series 
 Lucy-May of the Southern Rainbow (as Karine, L'Aventure Du Nouveau Monde)
 Fushigi no Kuni no Alice (as Alice au pays des merveilles)
 
In addition to the Japanese-based animated programs listed above, the channel also aired some animated programs from other sources, including Robotech, Clémentine, Snorks, Manu, Diplodos, Bucky O'Hare and the Toad Wars, and The Smurfs. Many of the Youpi! series were also aired in Italy as they had been licensed by Fininvest. The block helped popularise Japanese animation in France — it was sufficiently prominent in 1989 to be a target of criticism by then-representative Ségolène Royal. Many of the anime series that aired on La Cinq (notably Captain Tsubasa and Ai Shite Knight) would later air on TF1 as a part of the Club Dorothée block.

Decline (late 1987–1990)
Beginning in 1987, La Cinq ran into serious financial problems that would later be escalated by the privatisation of TF1 in the late 1980s and the early 1990s recession. Robert Hersant took over the channel in February 1987 and would remain the channel's president until September 1990, when Fininvest sold the channel to Hachette. In 1989, the channel's audience share peaked at 13.0%.

Hachette's La Cinq (1990–1991)
Under the weight of the debts accumulated since 1987 caused by the failure of a large part of the programs created, Robert Hersant criticized Berlusconi for selling American series as being too expensive. The latter disapproved of the great importance that Hersant gives to information, deeming it costly and unprofitable. Hersant, after a legal battle, realized that the debt burden of La Cinq were  threatening to crush his media group; he then ceded his share in La Cinq to the Hachette group then directed by Jean-Luc Lagardère, an unsuccessful candidate for the acquisition of TF1 in 1987 and who dreamt of acquiring a national television channel. Thanks to a capital increase, Hachette increased its stake in la Cinq from 22 to 25% while Hersant reduced it from 25 to 10%. On 23 October 1990, the Superior Audiovisual Council granted the channel to Hachette, which promised to “save La Cinq”.

When Yves Sabouret and Hachette took over control of La Cinq in the fall of 1990, the channel's audience share had declined to 11.7%. On 2 April 1991, the channel's second and final logo was introduced. Instead of trying to reduce the channel's budget deficit, Hachette commissioned an abundance of newer television series, including American import Twin Peaks and the game show Que le meilleur gagne. The continued commission and production of newer programmes by La Cinq increased the channel's budget deficit significantly; by mid-1991, the channel's deficit amounted to 3.5 billion francs. As a result, Berlusconi sold the rights of several of the children's programmes to AB Productions; those programmes were subsequently moved to TF1 before the end of the year.

1991 began with the Gulf War, allowing its newscasts to reach more than 9% of market share.

Hachette began changing everything, starting with the identity of the channel. Jean-Luc Lagardère gave carte blanche to his program director, Pascal Josèphe, whom he had just hired from Antenne 2, to launch new programs concocted by Hachette and which it was hoped would make La Cinq a large family generalist channel capable of competing against TF1. In fact, the channel was also obliged to produce new programs because the stock of American series was becoming scarce. From April 1991, Pascal Josèphe put on the air the prime time access schedule which he intended for Antenne 2 and which he revised.

Instead of trying to reduce costs and make up for the existing deficit, Hachette was increasing expenses (new identity, repair of all the premises, creation of too many new programs), and La Cinq had completely changed. Pascal Josèphe wished to focus on the female audience and on the family. Guillaume Durand was replaced at 8pm in order to unblock the audience. The slots devoted to news were diminished; Patrice Duhamel also gave instructions to journalists to reduce international subjects and reports in favor of national subjects.

22 new programmes were therefore put on the air in April 1991, but they all stopped after a few weeks or months, without succeeding in significantly increasing its market share with the exception of motorsports, with 40% of market share, for Formula 1 snatched from TF1, the Paris-Dakar, the Grand Prix de Pau, the Walt Disney movie slots on Tuesday evenings, Twin Peaks and the news, which were successful. La Cinq progressed only in urban areas.

Not only did its new programmes fail to attract new viewers, but these upheavals confused some of the faithful audience, to the point that the channel announces a rerun of Kojak to save the prime time access slot.

The audience remained stable, and the channel remained the third national channel in terms of rating; however, considering the new transmitters that relayed La Cinq's signal, the audience was reduced at this time. It was, in this case, around 11 to 14%. In addition, Lagardère did not succeed in relaxing the constraints imposed by the government, by regulation, so that it remained subject to the goodwill of the political power.

Bankruptcy and liquidation
One year after its takeover by Hachette, the channel's annual deficit amounted to CHF 1.1 billion, with cumulative losses since the channel's creation amounting to CHF 3.5 billion. On 17 December 1991, its CEO, Yves Sabouret, in a cost-cutting move, had to forcibly lay off 576 employees, amounting to more than 75% of the channel's staff. This did not have any effect on the channel, as it would file for bankruptcy only fourteen days later. On the evening of the announcement, Béatrice Schönberg and Gilles Schneider announced the sad event in their 8pm newscast, where its previous intro (the Earth, the satellite, Thus Spoke Zarathustra as the opening theme and the old logo) was broadcast at its end. A few days later, interviewed by Jean-Claude Bourret during the 8pm news, the CEO would hear from the presenter that the action taken "looks like a Formula 1 racing team that sells the tires to buy the gasoline”. On the screen, the "5" logo was displayed in black for 24 hours while a banner indicating that "La 5 will not be Matra-Racing" was brandished in the offices of the editorial staff. The channel's flags, which featured the new logo on the building on Boulevard Pereire, were torn off by staff. On December 31, 1991, La Cinq filed for bankruptcy. La Cinq was officially declared bankrupt on 2 January 1992 and placed in legal redress the following day, due to its inability to repay its entire debt.

A viewers' defence association for La Cinq started on the same day, led by Jean-Claude Bourret. Later that month, on 16 January, Berlusconi proposed a plan involving an increase in capital that would have saved the channel, but this increase was withdrawn on 24 March because of pressure from the government and the influence of certain politicians. A group of private channels (TF1, Canal+ and M6) proposed to jointly create a news channel which would replace La Cinq. The objective is twofold: to drive Silvio Berlusconi away from France and to ensure that no commercial channel is reborn on the fifth network.

As a result of the withdrawal of the rescue plan, on 3 April 1992, the Paris Commercial Court announced that, effective 12 April 1992 at midnight CET, La Cinq would be liquidated. The channel closed down permanently on 12 April 1992 at midnight, following its final program, Vive La Cinq (also known as Il est Moins 5), which pulled in an audience share of 21.5% (equal to about 6 to 7 million viewers).

The channel's final images before closing down entirely were a planet with the number 5 orbiting around it being blocked by a larger planet, creating a total eclipse, as the opening to Also Sprach Zarathustra (former news theme) was played. This was followed by a group of text slides that read this message:

It would be almost two years before the network's infrastructure was reactivated as a public educational channel, La Cinquième (now France 5).

Branding
La Cinq was one of the first French television channels to utilize a digital on-screen graphic when it launched in 1986. Its initial logo was derived from the first logo of Canale 5, which was introduced in 1985. However, the flower and the stylized symbol of the biscione were replaced with a gold star and the channel's name, respectively. In 1987, the channel's name was removed from the logo, which would continue to be used (albeit with a minor modification in October 1990) until April 1991.

The channel's second and final logo, which was designed by Jean-Paul Goude, consisted of the number 5 being superimposed on other numbers. It would be used from April 1991 until the channel's liquidation on 12 April 1992. The DOG accompanying the logo only displayed the number 5. It was inspired by the work of Jasper Johns (founding father of pop art), who produced canvases featuring numbers in the 1960s.

News operation
La Cinq's news operation consisted of a series of daily newscasts entitled Le Journal. The program was originally presented with a lunchtime newscast at 12:30 p.m. (later 1:00 pm) and a primetime newscast at 8:00 p.m. In the summer of 1990, the lunchtime newscast was moved to 12:45 p.m., where it would remain until the channel's closure in April 1992. Short-form news updates were also broadcast at various times of the day during breaks in the channel's programming.

From 1987 to April 1991, the theme music for the newscasts was a modified version of "Also sprach Zarathustra" (which would later be used on the channel's final newscast on 12 April 1992). During that time, the openings to all of the newscasts featured a rotating globe and a satellite, before showing the channel's logo and the newscast's title. When La Cinq's logo was changed in April 1991, the newscasts' openings were changed to a variant of the channel's ident with the word Information superimposed onto the channel's logo; this would be used until shortly before the channel's closure one year later. It was accompanied by a hard-hitting news music package.

Notable former on-air staff
Jean-Claude Bourret (main anchor; 1987–1992)
Marie-Laure Augry (1991–1992; later worked at TF1 and France 3)
Guillaume Durand (1987–1991; later worked at Europe 1)
Béatrice Schönberg (1991–1992; later worked at France 2)

See also
France 5

References

External links
 Culte : les derniers instants de La Cinq | Archive INA

Defunct television channels in France
French-language television stations
Mediaset television channels
Television channels and stations established in 1986
Television channels and stations disestablished in 1992
1986 establishments in France
1992 disestablishments in France